Keisa Monterola (born 26 February 1988) is a Venezuelan athlete specializing in the pole vault. She won silver medal at the 2005 World Youth Championships in Marrakech.

Her personal best jump is 4.33 metres outdoors (2011) and 4.37 metres indoors (2012).

Competition record

References
 

1988 births
Living people
Venezuelan female pole vaulters
Athletes (track and field) at the 2007 Pan American Games
Athletes (track and field) at the 2011 Pan American Games
Pan American Games competitors for Venezuela
South American Games gold medalists for Venezuela
South American Games medalists in athletics
Central American and Caribbean Games gold medalists for Venezuela
Competitors at the 2002 South American Games
Competitors at the 2006 South American Games
Competitors at the 2006 Central American and Caribbean Games
Competitors at the 2010 Central American and Caribbean Games
Central American and Caribbean Games medalists in athletics
21st-century Venezuelan women